José Ignacio Wert Ortega (born 18 February 1950, in Madrid) is a Spanish politician. On 22 December 2011 he was appointed Minister of Education, Culture and Sports by the president of the Spanish Government, Mariano Rajoy. He resigned on 25 June 2015 and was replaced by Íñigo Méndez de Vigo.

Biography 
José Ignacio Wert attended the Colegio Santa María del Pilar, in Madrid. He got the best academic record of his promotion in Law Degree at the Complutense, full of Honours and he obtained the Extraordinary Prize of Degree and a master's degree in Political Sociology from the Institute of Political Studies. In 1979 he entered Spanish Radio and Television Corporation by state exam for upper-level university graduates, initially as a technologist, and subsequently as deputy director of the Audience Research cabinet.

He taught Communication Theory in the Faculty of Information Sciences at the Complutense University of Madrid.

He was a member of the Democratic Left (Spain) until 1977, when he left the party to join Union of Democratic Center, holding political positions in several public bodies. In 1978 he was appointed Head of the Studies Service, on which both the Studies of Content and the Audience Research cabinets depended. In 1979 he was appointed Assistant Director-General of the Technical Cabinet of Centro de Investigaciones Sociológicas (CIS), the Spanish agency for sociological research, a body that reported to the Presidency of the Government. In 1980, the Senate appointed him member of the Advisory Council of the Spanish Radio and Television Corporation, on a proposal from the UCD.

Between 1974 and 1978 he taught Political Sociology in the Faculty of Economic Science at the Autonomous University of Madrid.

During the crisis within the UCD, Wert become a member of the Democratic Popular Party, being one of the components of its National Executive Commission. In the municipal elections of 1983, his party appointed him as a member of the People's Coalition nomination (the coalition of People's Alliance, the PDP and the Liberal Union) for Madrid. He was then elected councilor of the Madrid City Council. He was in the city council until the 1986 general elections, when he was elected deputy for A Coruña, as PDP candidate in the Popular Coalition lists again.

In 1986 he resigned his seat to work in various positions within the private sector, especially in polling firms, and an audience measurement firm.

In 2003 he started to work for the BBVA, as deputy to the President of the bank, Francisco González, acting as BBVA Group's Director of Corporate Relations. From 2003 to 2005, he presided the European Foundation for Quality Management (EFQM), in representation of the BBVA. After leaving BBVA, he was named president of Inspire Consultores.

Minister of Education, Culture and Sport 
On 22 December 2011 he was appointed Spanish Minister of Education, Culture and Sport. On 31 January 2012 his reform project for the general secondary education is announced. According to it, the compulsory secondary education would be reduced to one year, going from 4 years to 2 years, the Romanian Baccalaureate would increase by one year, rising from 2 to 4 years. This requires removing the fourth year of secondary education. The trade unions don't agree with that measure, as they fear a covert process of privatization. Other sectors, such as part of the teachers, have complained about its huge costs and the uncertain of its efficacy.
Apparently, this reform would link with the LOCE, passed by the former government of the PP, presided by José María Aznar, but that was never applied due to Zapatero's arrival in government, who finally passed a new Organic Law on Education.

One of the decisions he took was to subsidize again the Biographical Spanish Dictionary, published by the Spanish Royal Academy of History (with 193,000 euros), in spite of the controversy caused by some of the entries, such as the one devoted to General Francisco Franco, whom his biographer doesn't call dictator and also makes no reference to much of the period of repression. In July 2011, the Congress of Deputies passed a motion calling for the withdrawal of funds for the Biographical Spanish Dictionary if the failures were not corrected effectively. A month before, the Spanish Royal Academy of History had been forced to create a commission to report possible errors; but on 26 May 2012, according to El País, the academy decided (without revealing the conclusions of its commission) not to either correct any biography or write alternative biographies to the ones already published, and that there would be only minor changes in a final addendum, and that there would be no modifications to the online version.

He resigned on 25 June 2016, to become the Spanish ambassador to the OECD.

The replacement of the Education for Citizenship
On 31 January 2012, José Ignacio Wert announced that the subject Education for Citizenship, which was severely criticized by the Catholic Church and by the Partido Popular itself, would be replaced by another subject, called Civil and Constitutional education that, according to the minister, would be "free of controversial issues" and won't be "capable of any ideological recruitment". The Catholic parents' associations were in favor of this measure.

According to El País, the new contents elude homophobia and social inequalities, but include denunciations of the so-called "exclusionary nationalism". Furthermore, the new contents emphasize the importance of private economic activity as a factor "in the creation of wealth", and also promote the respect for "intellectual property".

The cuts and the general strike in the public education sector on 22 May 2012
On 17 May 2012, the Congress of Deputies ratified, supported exclusively by the deputies of the People's Party, the government decree cutting public expenditure on education and health, estimated at over 10,000 million euros (7,200 in Health and 3,700 in Education), to meet the deficit target set by the European Union.
On 22 May 2012, a general strike supported by all sectors of education (from nursery school through university) took place. This was the first unitary strike in the education sector in the history of Spain. Organized by the teacher unions and the student organizations, it was a protest against the Ministry of Education's latest measures that, they claimed, endangered the future of public education. The objective of the measures is, according to Wert, to reduce the education costs to meet the deficit target set by the European Union.

Among the most noteworthy of these measures are an increase in the number of pupils per classroom (from 25 to 30 pupils in primary school, from 30 to 36 in secondary school and from 35 to 42 in the Baccalaureate). Other measures include the increase in the number of teaching hours (added to the cuts in teachers' salaries decreed by most of the autonomous communities); the decision of not covering sick leave that lasts less than 15 days, and a raise in university fees. The introduction of fees as high as 350 euros for Advanced Level Vocation Training programs. The following day the rectors of the public universities boycotted the Universities' Council meeting called by the Minister Wert, in protest against the exclusion from the agenda of the day of about the rise in university fees or the cost-cutting measures that involve the university.

References

External links 

 Ficha de José Ignacio Wert, en la web del Congreso de los Diputados
 Artículos publicados, en Dialnet
 Semblanza de José Ignacio Wert en "El País", 27 de mayo de 2012

Living people
1950 births
Politicians from Madrid
People's Party (Spain) politicians
Complutense University of Madrid alumni
Government ministers of Spain
Education ministers of Spain
Culture ministers of Spain
Madrid city councillors (1983–1987)
Ambassadors of Spain to the Organisation for Economic Co-operation and Development